Sharpe's rail (Gallirallus sharpei) is a species of bird in the family Rallidae. It is known only from the type specimen of unknown origin, but it has been speculated that it originated from Indonesia. Due to the lack of recent records, it has been considered extinct, but new evidence suggests it is possibly better regarded as a morph of the buff-banded rail.

The common name and Latin binomial name commemorate  the British zoologist Richard Bowdler Sharpe.

Notes

References
 BirdLife International (2008).  .   2008 IUCN Red List of Threatened Species.  Downloaded on 4 November 2008.
 BirdLife International Globally Threatened Forums (2008). Sharpe’s Rail (Gallirallus sharpei): no longer recognised taxonomically. Accessed 2008-12-15.

Sharpe's rail
Birds of Indonesia
Controversial bird taxa
Sharpe's rail
Taxa named by Johann Büttikofer
Articles containing video clips
Taxonomy articles created by Polbot
Taxobox binomials not recognized by IUCN 
Species known from a single specimen